Cult Grass Stars is an album by Thee Michelle Gun Elephant, released in 1996. It is their first full release since being signed to Triad, following the self-released Maximum! Maximum!! Maximum!!! in 1993.

Track listing
 "Lizard" - 4:28
 "Strawberry Garden" - 5:18
 "King" - 3:18
 "World's End (primitive version)" - 5:46
 "Toy" - 5:28
 "Black Tambourine" - 2:53
 "I Was Walkin' & Sleepin'" - 5:16
 "Dallas Fried Chicken" - 0:40
 "Letter To Uncle Sam" - 8:13
 "Suicide Morning" - 4:42
 "Don't Sulk Baby" - 4:45
 "I Have To Sleep" - 6:36
 "Remember Amsterdam" - 3:04

References

Thee Michelle Gun Elephant albums
1996 albums